The Canton of Levet is a former canton situated in the Cher département and in the Centre region of France. It was disbanded following the French canton reorganisation which came into effect in March 2015. It consisted of 13 communes, which joined the new canton of Trouy in 2015. It had 10,922 inhabitants (2012).

Geography
An area of farming and forestry in the arrondissement of Bourges centred on the town of Levet. The altitude varies from 122m at Saint-Caprais to 184m at Vorly, with an average altitude of 170m.

The canton comprised 13 communes:

Annoix
Arçay
Lapan
Levet
Lissay-Lochy
Plaimpied-Givaudins
Saint-Caprais
Saint-Just
Sainte-Lunaise
Senneçay
Soye-en-Septaine
Trouy
Vorly

Population

See also
 Arrondissements of the Cher department
 Cantons of the Cher department
 Communes of the Cher department

References

Levet
2015 disestablishments in France
States and territories disestablished in 2015